The 117th Mahrattas were an infantry regiment of the British Indian Army. The regiment traces their origins to 1800, when they were raised as the Bombay Fencible Regiment.

During World War I the regiment was attached to the 6th (Poona) Division, served in the Mesopotamian campaign, and delivered a setback at the Battle of Ctesiphon in November 1915. They were forced to withdraw back to Kut, and forced to surrender after the Siege of Kut.

After World War I the Indian government reformed the army moving from single battalion regiments to multi-battalion regiments. In 1922, the 117th Mahrattas became the 5th Battalion 5th Mahratta Light Infantry. After independence they were one of the regiments allocated to the Indian Army.

Predecessor names 
Bombay Fencible Regiment - 1800
1st Battalion, 9th Regiment of Bombay Native Infantry - 1803
17th Bombay Native Infantry - 1824
17th Bombay Infantry - 1885
117th Matrattas - 1903

References

Sources

Moberly, F.J. (1923). Official History of the War: Mesopotamia Campaign, Imperial War Museum. 

British Indian Army infantry regiments
Bombay Presidency
Military units and formations established in 1800
Military units and formations disestablished in 1922